Captain Christy (foaled 1967) was a champion Irish-bred and Irish-trained hurdler and steeplechaser who won the Cheltenham Gold Cup as a novice.

In spite of a tendency to make mistakes, Captain Christy was an outstanding hurdler and one of the best steeplechasers of all time. He was the top-rated steeplechaser in Britain and Ireland for three successive seasons, 1972–73 to 1975–76. His most outstanding performance was his 30-length win over Bula and other top horses in the 1975 King George VI Chase at Kempton Park; this is regarded as one of the greatest ever steeplechasing performances. Gerry Newman rode him in that race, but for most of his other successes his jockeys were Bobby Beasley and Bobby Coonan. Throughout his career, Captain Christy was trained by Pat Taaffe, and that victory over Bula was the second time he had beaten the dual Champion Hurdle winner; he had also outgalloped him when winning the 1972 Irish Sweeps Hurdle when the race was a championship (non-handicap) event. He finished third in that year's Champion Hurdle at Cheltenham before winning the Scottish equivalent. Captain Christy's most important success came in the 1974 Cheltenham Gold Cup when, as a novice ridden by Bobby Beasley, he beat the previous year's winner, The Dikler, by five lengths despite making a mistake at the last fence. Later that year he won his first King George VI Chase when, ridden by Bobby Coonan, he easily beat the outstanding three-mile chaser, Pendil, who had won the race in 1972 and 1973. In 1975 Captain Christy finished a close second under top-weight in the Whitbread Gold Cup giving over two stones in weight to the winner, April the Seventh. He also raced beyond Britain and Ireland, including finishing runner-up in the Grand Steeple-Chase de Paris and coming fourth in the Colonial Cup in the USA. Captain Christy developed a leg problem after his 1975 King George VI Chase win which effectively ended his career while still a relatively young horse.

References

 The Complete Encyclopedia of Horse Racing – written by Bill Mooney and George Ennor

1967 racehorse births
Cheltenham Gold Cup winners
Cheltenham Festival winners
Thoroughbred family 26
Racehorses bred in Ireland
Racehorses trained in Ireland